Diuris curta is a species of orchid that is endemic to eastern Australia. It has one or two leaves and up to five bright yellow flowers with two small dark spots on the dorsal sepal. It grows on coastal headlands between about Byfield in Queensland and Hat Head in New South Wales.

Description
Flowering occurs from August to early October.

Taxonomy and naming
Diuris curta was first formally described in 2006 by David Jones from a specimen collected near Hat Head and the description was published in Australian Orchid Research. The specific epithet (curta) is a Latin word meaning "short", referring to the short habit of this orchid, which is probably a result of adaptation to the exposed environment.

Distribution and habitat
This orchid grows on coastal headlands between Byfield and Hat Head, often in places exposed to the sea.

Conservation
Invasion by weeds including bitou bush and native shrubs in the absence of fire threaten D. curta.

References

curta
Endemic orchids of Australia
Orchids of New South Wales
Orchids of Queensland
Plants described in 2006